Avondale is a city in Clay County, Missouri, United States. The population was 436 at the 2020 census. It is part of the Kansas City metropolitan area.

History
A post office called Avondale was established in 1915. The city was named after the River Avon, in England.
Avondale is the birthplace of World War Two hero Carl Beck. Carl served in the 101st Airborne at Normandy and at Bastogne.

Geography
Avondale is located at  (39.155236, -94.546704).

Demographics

2010 census
As of the census of 2010, there were 440 people, 199 households, and 109 families living in the city. The racial makeup of the city was 89.1% White, 4.1% African American, 1.1% Native American, 0.5% Asian, 0.2% Pacific Islander, 1.4% from other races, and 3.6% from two or more races. Hispanic or Latino of any race were 7.0% of the population.

There were 199 households, of which 22.1% had children under the age of 18 living with them, 37.7% were married couples living together, 11.6% had a female householder with no husband present, 5.5% had a male householder with no wife present, and 45.2% were non-families. 30.2% of all households were made up of individuals, and 9% had someone living alone who was 65 years of age or older. The average household size was 2.21 and the average family size was 2.78.

The median age in the city was 43.4 years. 18% of residents were under the age of 18; 6.1% were between the ages of 18 and 24; 27.5% were from 25 to 44; 33.6% were from 45 to 64; and 14.8% were 65 years of age or older. The gender makeup of the city was 53.0% male and 47.0% female.

2000 census
As of the census of 2000, there were 529 people, 219 households, and 146 families living in the city. The racial makeup of the city was 94.52% White, 0.95% African American, 0.76% Native American, 0.38% Asian, 2.08% from other races, and 1.32% from two or more races. Hispanic or Latino of any race were 2.27% of the population.

There were 219 households, out of which 26.9% had children under the age of 18 living with them, 49.8% were married couples living together, 9.6% had a female householder with no husband present, and 33.3% were non-families. 22.8% of all households were made up of individuals, and 5.5% had someone living alone who was 65 years of age or older. The average household size was 2.42 and the average family size was 2.84.

In the city the population was spread out, with 20.2% under the age of 18, 10.0% from 18 to 24, 34.6% from 25 to 44, 21.9% from 45 to 64, and 13.2% who were 65 years of age or older. The median age was 37 years. For every 100 females, there were 100.4 males. For every 100 females age 18 and over, there were 107.9 males.

The median income for a household in the city was $37,159, and the median income for a family was $38,958. Males had a median income of $33,750 versus $25,833 for females. The per capita income for the city was $17,372. About 9.6% of families and 10.1% of the population were below the poverty line, including 6.3% of those under age 18 and 2.8% of those age 65 or over.

Education
North Kansas City School District is the area school district. Avondale is zoned to Choteau Elementary School, Northgate Middle School, and North Kansas City High School.

References

Cities in Clay County, Missouri
Cities in Kansas City metropolitan area
Cities in Missouri